Reeling is the debut album by British alternative rock band the Mysterines, released 11 March 2022 via Fiction Records.

Reception

Year-end lists

Track listing

Personnel

Musicians 
 Lia Metcalfe – vocals, guitar, piano (3, 13), percussion (4, 7, 13)
 Callum Thompson – guitar (1-11, 13), backing vocals (1-7, 9-11)
 George Favager – bass guitar (1-6, 8-11, 13), backing vocals (7)
 Paul Crilly – drums (1-11, 13), percussion (4-7, 10, 11, 13), guitar (4, 11), backing vocals (4, 6, 7, 11, 13)
 Ben Harper – backing vocals (11)
 Matthew Thomson – backing vocals (13)

Technical 
 Catherine Marks – producer, mixing (2-13)
 Richie Kennedy – mixing, recording engineer
 Ben Harper – assistant recording engineer
 John Davis – mastering engineer
 Alan Moulder – mixing (1)
 Tom Herbert – mixing assistant (1)
 Caesar Edmunds – mix engineer (1)

Charts

References 

2022 debut albums
Fiction Records albums
Albums produced by Catherine Marks
Grunge albums
Garage rock albums by English artists